Minsterley railway station was a terminus station in Minsterley, Shropshire, England. The station was opened in 1861 and closed in 1951.

References

Further reading

Disused railway stations in Shropshire
Railway stations in Great Britain opened in 1861
Railway stations in Great Britain closed in 1951
Former Great Western Railway stations
Former London and North Western Railway stations